Roepkiella chloratus is a moth in the family Cossidae first described by Charles Swinhoe in 1892. It is found in Sundaland and the Philippines. The habitat consists of lowland rainforests.

Larvae bore in the bark of Parkia species.

References

Cossinae